The 1968 Washington Darts season was the first season of the new team in the American Soccer League, and the club's second season in professional soccer.  It is also the first instance in which the club uses this name. Previously, the club was known as the Washington Britannica.  This year, the team finished at the top of the table and therefore won the ASL Championship.

Background

Review

Competitions

ASL regular season

Results summaries

Results by round

Match reports

Statistics

Transfers

References 

1968
Washington Darts
Washington Darts